1329 Eliane, provisional designation , is a stony asteroid and a potentially slow rotator from the central region of the asteroid belt, approximately 20 kilometers in diameter. It was discovered on 23 March 1933, by Belgian astronomer Eugène Delporte at the Uccle Observatory in Belgium. The asteroid was named after the daughter of astronomer Paul Bourgeois.

Orbit and classification 

The S-type asteroid orbits the Sun in the central main-belt at a distance of 2.2–3.1 AU once every 4 years and 3 months (1,546 days). Its orbit has an eccentricity of 0.17 and an inclination of 14° with respect to the ecliptic.

Rotation period 

A rotational lightcurve of Eliane revealed a potentially very long rotation period of  hours with a brightness amplitude of 0.30 in magnitude. American astronomer Brian Warner at the Palmer Divide Observatory, Colorado, originally took the photometric observations in April 2001. The body's long period was only discovered after the data had been reevaluated in 2010. As of 2017, the potentially slow rotator has not been further examined.

Diameter and albedo 

According to the surveys carried out by the Japanese Akari satellite and NASA's Wide-field Infrared Survey Explorer with its subsequent NEOWISE mission, the asteroid measures between 19.5 and 22.6 kilometers in diameter and its surface has an albedo in the range of 0.15 to 0.18. The Collaborative Asteroid Lightcurve Link assumes a standard albedo for stony asteroids of 0.20, and calculates a diameter of 19.6 kilometers using an absolute magnitude of 10.90.

Naming 

This minor planet was named after Éliane Bourgeois, daughter of astronomer Paul Bourgeois, who was a professor at the discovering Royal Observatory in Uccle, Belgium, and after whom the asteroid 1543 Bourgeois is named. The official  was mentioned in The Names of the Minor Planets by Paul Herget in 1955. Bourgeois himself is credited with the discovery of 1547 Nele.

Notes

References

External links 
  
 Asteroid Lightcurve Database (LCDB), query form (info )
 Dictionary of Minor Planet Names, Google books
 Asteroids and comets rotation curves, CdR – Observatoire de Genève, Raoul Behrend
 Discovery Circumstances: Numbered Minor Planets (1)-(5000) – Minor Planet Center
 
 

001329
Discoveries by Eugène Joseph Delporte
Named minor planets
001329
001329
19330323